John "Little Caesar" Acropolis (1909 – August 26, 1952) was an American labor leader. He served as president of Local 456 of the International Brotherhood of Teamsters in Westchester County, NY from 1946 until his death.

Background
Acropolis was orphaned at age three and raised in a series of charitable institutions. He attended Colgate University where he played on the basketball team.

Acropolis became interested in union issues while working as a truck driver during summer break from college. He joined Local 456 and was first elected as a union officer in the early 1940s.

Death
After becoming president of Local 456, Acropolis challenged the Genovese crime family over its control of certain garbage carting contracts in the suburbs of New York City. He expanded the size of his local to more than 2,000 members.
Acropolis was killed in 1952 by an unknown assailant who fired two bullets into his head. The case has not been solved.

In October, 2008, the New York Civil Liberties Union filed a lawsuit against the Yonkers, New York Police Department, demanding access to the department's file on the investigation into the death of Acropolis. The City of Yonkers said it would fight the lawsuit, claiming that because the investigation was still technically active, the case file was not subject to Freedom of Information laws.

See also
List of unsolved murders

References

External links
NY Journal News report on NYCLU lawsuit
NYCLU Press Release and link to lawsuit
WCBS-TV report on lawsuit and Acropolis killing
NY Journal News report on 50th anniversary of Acropolis murder

1909 births
1952 deaths
1952 murders in the United States
American murder victims
Colgate Raiders men's basketball players
Colgate University alumni
Deaths by firearm in New York (state)
International Brotherhood of Teamsters people
Male murder victims
People murdered in New York (state)
Trade unionists from New York (state)
Unsolved murders in the United States